John Percy Davis (26 January 1884 – 16 February 1951) was an English cricketer who played four first-class matches for Worcestershire in 1922. His most significant performance was the 38 not out he made against Warwickshire in the second innings of his debut match.

Davis was born in Lye, Worcestershire; he died at the age of 67 in nearby Heath, Stourbridge.

His brother Major Davis played once for Worcestershire in 1911.

External links
 
 Statistical summary from CricketArchive

1884 births
1951 deaths
English cricketers
Worcestershire cricketers